The 1965 Marshall Thundering Herd football team was an American football team that represented Marshall University in the Mid-American Conference (MAC) during the 1965 NCAA University Division football season. In its seventh season under head coach Charlie Snyder, the team compiled a 5–5 record (2–4 against conference opponents), tied for fifth place out of seven teams in the MAC, and was outscored by a total of 168 to 151. Howard Miller and Tom Good were the team captains. The team played its home games at Fairfield Stadium in Huntington, West Virginia.

Schedule

References

Marshall
Marshall Thundering Herd football seasons
Marshall Thundering Herd football